Raoul Giraudo (19 May 1932 – 26 October 1995) was a French football defender. He is best known for playing for Reims, where he reached the European Cup finals in 1956 and 1959.

References

 

1932 births
1995 deaths
French footballers
Association football defenders
Ligue 1 players
Stade de Reims players
Grenoble Foot 38 players
FC Sochaux-Montbéliard players
Pays d'Aix FC players